The 1988–89 Coppa Italia was the 42nd Coppa Italia, the major Italian domestic cup. The competition was won by Sampdoria, who defeated Napoli 4–1 on aggregate in a two-legged final played at Stadio San Paolo (Napoli's home venue) and Stadio Giovanni Zini (neutral venue due to unavailability of Sampdoria's Stadio Luigi Ferraris home venue).

First round

Group 1

Group 2

Group 3

Group 4

Group 5

Group 6

Group 7

Group 8

Second round

Group 1

Group 2

Group 3

Group 4

Group 5

Atalanta and Fiorentina admitted to the quarter-finals as best second.

Group 6

Quarter-finals

Semi-finals

Final

First leg

Second leg

Sampdoria won 4-1 on aggregate.

Top goalscorers

References
rsssf.com

Coppa Italia seasons
Coppa Italia
Coppa Italia